is a Japanese actress, who has played quite a few different characters in various Tokusatsu series. Her prominent role in the Ultra Series is Laiha Toba of Ultraman Geed.

Filmography

TV series

Film

Video game

References

External links
  
 

1996 births
Living people
Japanese television actresses
Japanese film actresses
21st-century Japanese actresses
Stardust Promotion artists